Samar "Badru" Banerjee (30 January 1930 – 20 August 2022) was an Indian footballer who played primarily as a striker for the India national football team. He captained India at the 1956 Summer Olympics in Melbourne, where they achieved fourth place.

Early and personal life

Samar Banerjee was born on 30 January 1930, in Bally, Howrah, Bengal Presidency. His father, Sasanka Sekhar Banerjee, enrolled him in R. G. Kar Medical College for medical education. In 1959, he got a job in Burma Shell Company, and was posted in Siliguri. However, his love for the game brought him back to Kolkata for training on weekends, but hanged up his boots later after having a remarkable playing career.

Club career
Banerjee's footballing journey started as a school-going kid. In his childhood, after returning from school, going to kick football became a kind of rule. He started playing at Bali Hindu Sporting Club and also used to play football at Wellington Club. At the age of 18, he went on to represent Bally Protiva Club, a third division team of Calcutta Football League at that time. In an interview on the website of Mohun Bagan AC, Badru said, "Since then I started playing with boots. As a result, when I got the chance to play in the boots later on, I didn't have a day even though my teammates were struggling." Having impressed with his skills, he was roped in by Bengal Nagpur Railway (BNR).

He later joined Mohun Bagan AC during an excellent eight-year stint. The formation of Banerjee's deadly combination up front with Kesto Pal achieved endless success in the century old club. Banerjee won the IFA Shield in his debut season with the "green-and-maroon brigade" in controversial final against Rajasthan Club of Calcutta. He then guided the club to their first ever Durand Cup next season. Banerjee again hogged the Maidan limelight in 1954 when they secured another first, a double with the CFL and IFA Shield titles. He was also part of Mohun Bagan's foreign tour of 1956, in which they won all four matches.

In 1958, Banerjee was chosen as team captain. Besides guiding Mohun Bagan to several trophies including their first ever Durand Cup in 1953, Rovers Cup in 1955, Banerjee has represented West Bengal and won Santosh Trophy twice in 1953 and 1955.

International career
Banerjee went on to represent Syed Abdul Rahim–managed India national team during the "golden era" of Indian football. He then toured with the club to East Africa, with players including P. K. Banerjee. He also played under captaincy of Sailen Manna in international matches, and is highly influenced by him during his playing career.

With India, he participated in three Summer Olympics and captained the team in 1956 that finished fourth, after losing to Bulgaria 3–0 in the bronze medal playoff.

Managerial career
After retiring, Banerjee involved in coaching and managed then Calcutta Football League premier division side Barisha Sporting Club. He then became head coach of Bengal in 1961, and guided the team winning 1962 Santosh Trophy.

Death
Banerjee died from complications of COVID-19 on 20 August 2022, at the age of 92.

Career statistics
Scores and results list India's goal tally first, score column indicates score after each Banerjee goal.

Honours
Mohun Bagan
 Durand Cup: 1953
 Calcutta Football League: 1954, 1955, 1956, 1959
 IFA Shield: 1952, 1954, 1956
 Rovers Cup: 1955

India
 Colombo Cup: 1954

Bengal
 Santosh Trophy: 1953, 1955

Individual
 Mohun Bagan Ratna: 2009
 Jiban Kriti Sanman by the Government of West Bengal: 2017

See also

 History of Indian football
 History of the India national football team
 India national football team at the Olympics
 List of India national football team captains

References

Bibliography

External links
 

1930 births
2022 deaths
Indian footballers
People from Howrah
Mohun Bagan AC players
Footballers from West Bengal
Olympic footballers of India
India international footballers
Footballers at the 1956 Summer Olympics
University of Calcutta alumni
Association football forwards
Calcutta Football League players
Deaths from the COVID-19 pandemic in India